Vishwajeet (Sanskrit: विश्वजीत; Bengali: বিশ্বজিৎ) is an Indian masculine name of Indo-Aryan origin. In the Sanskrit language, vishwa  means 'universe' and jeet  means 'victory'. Thereby, Vishwajeet can be loosely translated as 'conqueror of the universe'. It is also the name of an ancient yajna (sacrifice) mentioned in the Vedas, performed by brahmins upon the victory of a monarch in war.

Notable people

Bengalis 

Biswajit Chatterjee, prominent Bengali actor
Biswajit Bhattacharya, manager of East Bengal F.C.
Kumar Bishwajit (Dey), Bengali singer and composer
Bishwajit Bhattacharjee, researcher and professor at Indian Institute of Technology Delhi
Biswajit Biswas, footballer at United S.C. 
Pandit Biswajit Roy Chowdhury, Hindustani classical musician
Biswajit Chattopadhyay, Bengali actor
Biswajit Saha, footballer
Bishwajit Bhattacharyya, former Solicitor General of India
Biswajit Paul, cricketer

Others 
Vishwajeet Pradhan, Bollywood actor
Vishvjit Singh, Indian National Congress politician
Vishwajit Pratapsingh Rane, MLA from Goa
Vishvajit Malla, King of the Malla dynasty
Biswajit Daimary, politician, member of the Rajya Sabha
Vishwajeet, mythological ancestor of the Chola dynasty mentioned in the Thiruvalangadu copperplate

See also

Indian name
Given name

References

Indian given names
Masculine given names